Velasco is a Spanish surname and given name.

Velasco may also refer to:

Geography
, Spain
Velasco, Texas, United States
Velasco, Cuba
Velasco Reef, Kayangel, Republic of Palau

Bolivia
José Miguel de Velasco Province
San Ignacio de Velasco
San Miguel de Velasco
San Rafael de Velasco 
Santa Ana de Velasco

Astronomy
20719 Velasco, an asteroid

History
Battle of Velasco (1832), between the Republic of Mexico and a rebelling Mexican state
Treaties of Velasco (1836), between the republics of Mexico and Texas

Ships
Spanish cruiser Velasco, a Spanish cruiser that fought in the Spanish–American War
Velasco class cruiser, of which the Velasco was the lead ship